Frank Bruce "Doc" Robinson (1886 – 19 October 1948) was an American New Thought author and spiritual leader. A pharmacist in Moscow, Idaho, Robinson was the son of an English Baptist minister. He studied in a Canadian Bible school but later rejected organized religion in favor of the New Thought Movement. In 1928, he founded the spiritual movement Psychiana. Robinson was also publisher of the Idahoan newspaper. Psychiana's International Headquarters building still stands on 2nd Street, as does Robinson's house on Howard Street. Robinson's most lasting impact on Moscow and Latah County is the eponymous Robinson Park, for which he donated the land.

References

External links
University of Idaho library - A brief biography of Frank Bruce Robinson
Latah County Parks - Robinson County Park

1886 births
1948 deaths
Baptists from Idaho
New Thought writers
People from Moscow, Idaho
20th-century American newspaper publishers (people)
American spiritual writers
American pharmacists
20th-century Baptists